This Is the Second Album of a Band Called Adebisi Shank is the second studio album by Irish math rock band Adebisi Shank. It was released on 20 August 2010 through Richter Collective.

Composition
The album was seen as having a more cohesive development over their previous album. The band has stated that the first album's tracks were written by individual members and then the product was finished by the group, whereas the second album was written by the three of them collaboratively.
With the band describing the whole writing process as "a lot more cohesive and diverse and fun." The album features guest appearances from Conor O'Brien of Villagers and Richie Egan of Jape.

Title and packaging
The album art is seen as depicting two zebras with a "Tron-style neon landscape" which is seen as aptly describing the feeling behind the album itself. The track titled "(-_-)" is named after the Japanese emoticon that translates to "meh".

Accolades
Choice Music Prize

|-
| 2011 || This is the Second Album of a band called Adebisi Shank || Irish Album of the Year 2010 || 
|-

Track listing

Charts

References

2010 albums
Adebisi Shank albums